Candoia bibroni, commonly known as Bibron's bevel-nosed boa, Bibron's keel-scaled boa, the Pacific tree boa, or the Fiji boa, is a boa species endemic to Melanesia and Polynesia. Two subspecies are recognized, including the nominate subspecies described here. Like all other boas, it is not venomous.

Etymology
The specific name, bibroni, is in honor of French herpetologist Gabriel Bibron.

Description
C. bibroni is the largest member of the genus Candoia; adults can grow to up to 5ft /1.5 meters in total length (including the tail). The color pattern usually consists of a pale brown, tan, or reddish-brown ground color overlaid with stripes, blotches, or spots. However, some individuals have no pattern at all.

Geographic range
C. bibroni is found in Melanesia and Polynesia, including the eastern Solomon Islands (Olu Malau, Ugi, Rennell, Makira, Santa Ana, Santa Cruz, Bellona, Vanikoro and Utupua), the Banks Islands (Vanua Lava Island), Vanuatu, all three of the Loyalty Islands, the Fiji Islands (Rotuma, the Yasawa Group and the Lau Group), Western Samoa (Savaiʻi and Upolu Islands), and American Samoa (Taʻū Island).

The type locality given is "l'île Viti" (local name of Fiji Islands’ archipelago). Jacquinot and Guichenot (1853) list the type locality as "de l'archipel de Viti, Polynésie".

Habitat

Feeding
C. bibroni hunts for food both on the ground and in the trees, preying on birds, lizards, and mammals, including bats.

Reproduction
C. bibroni is viviparous.

Subspecies

References

Further reading
Boulenger GA (1893). Catalogue of the Snakes in the British Museum (Natural History). Volume I., Containing the Families ... Boidæ ... London: Trustees of the British Museum (Natural History). (Taylor and Francis, printers). xiii + 448 pp. + Plates I-XXVIII. (Enygrus bibronii, pp. 106–107).
Dumeril AMC, Bibron G (1844). Erpétologie générale ou Histoire naturelle complète des Reptiles. Tome sixième. Paris: Roret. xii + 609 pp. (Enygrus bibroni, new species, pp. 483–484). (in French).
Schweizer H (1970). "Farbwechsel bei einer Pazifik-Boa (Candoia bibroni australis Montrousier, 1860) [= Color change in a Pacific Boa (Candoia bibroni australis Montrouzier, 1860)]". Aqua Terra 7 (2): 19–22. (in German).

External links

bibroni
Reptiles described in 1844
Taxa named by André Marie Constant Duméril
Taxa named by Gabriel Bibron
Reptiles of Oceania
Reptiles of Fiji
Reptiles of the Solomon Islands
Snakes of New Caledonia